Consortium: The Tower is a first-person shooter role-playing video game. It is the sequel to Consortium, developed by Interdimensional Games. It takes place in an alternate reality 2042.

The first Kickstarter campaign for Consortium: The Tower ended February 19, 2016, raising $182,780 CAD of the $450,000 CAD (US$138,016 of the US$339,791)  goal. Interdimensional Games turned to Fig to raise US$300,000 which ended on May 11, 2016.  The game was released to Steam Early Access on September 21, 2017. The game was originally expected to be released in 2019.

Plot
Consortium: The Tower follows immediately after the events of Consortium and continues Bishop Six's tumultuous initiation into the global police force known as the Consortium. Dropping onto the fictitious Churchill Tower in London in the year 2042, which has reportedly been occupied by Islamic terrorists thought to have been dealt with at the turn of the century. The conspiracies and deceptions continue to expand and unravel as Six works his way through the tower, dealing with Canadian drug peddlers, slimy journalists and the mysterious entity known only as The Voice. The Tower expands the cast bringing in a host of new friends and foes and revisits the existing relationships established in Consortium.

Gameplay
The game offers a lot freedom of motion with a significant degree of verticality, allowing for typical running and jumping, but also charged super jumping, short boosts, and even flying in the form of the Free Fall Suit. Players have the choice of the more combat-focused Battle Utility Suit as well which has more limited movement in exchange for added protection. The former helps Bishop Six evade hostiles and obstacles while the latter allows him to confront them directly using an assortment of lethal and non-lethal weapons. Consortium: The Tower also allows players to talk to squad members, squad leaders, and major NPCS—even make "ghost noises" to draw attention or even defuse a situation gone wrong. The game follows Doom (2016) in using a dynamic ledge-grab system, that allows the player to climb onto surfaces if a jump or flight came up short of landing on it.

The Churchill Tower itself acts as an antagonist with nanites reshaping it: floors are bent perpendicular, the water treatment plant has been moved well over 100 floors above ground level, and turrets have erected themselves to impede the player. The Tower features secrets, mazes, and traps in interlocking maps that allow the player to complete objectives in virtually any order they want to.

Development
The game has been in development on Steam Early Access since 2017. While developer announcements continue, no major update has been made since 2019, the original planned release year.

References

External links
Developer website
Official website

Upcoming video games
Crowdfunding projects
First-person shooters
Indie video games
Role-playing video games
Science fiction video games
Windows games
MacOS games
Linux games
PlayStation 4 games
Xbox One games
Video games set in London
Unreal Engine games
Video games developed in the United States
Video games scored by Jeremy Soule
Video games set in the 2040s